The compound of four octahedra with rotational freedom is a uniform polyhedron compound. It consists in a symmetric arrangement of 4 octahedra, considered as triangular antiprisms. It can be constructed by superimposing four identical octahedra, and then rotating each by an equal angle θ about a separate axis passing through the centres of two opposite octahedral faces, in such a way as to preserve pyritohedral symmetry.

Superimposing this compound with a second copy, in which the octahedra have been rotated by the same angle θ in the opposite direction, yields the compound of eight octahedra with rotational freedom.

When θ = 0, all four octahedra coincide. When θ is 60 degrees, the more symmetric compound of four octahedra (without rotational freedom) arises. In another notable case (pictured), when 

 

24 of the triangles form coplanar pairs, and the compound assumes the form of the compound of five octahedra with one of the octahedra removed.

Gallery

References
 .

Polyhedral compounds